The Netherlands Football League Championship 1904–1905 was contested by eighteen teams participating in two divisions. The western division had been divided during the last two seasons, but was combined again. The national champion would be determined by a play-off featuring the winners of the eastern and western football division of the Netherlands. HVV Den Haag won this year's championship by beating PW 4-1 and 4–2.

New entrants
Eerste Klasse East:
RKVV Wilhelmina

Eerste Klasse West:
DFC
HC & CV Quick

Divisions

Eerste Klasse East

Eerste Klasse West

Championship play-off

HVV Den Haag won the championship.

References
RSSSF Netherlands Football League Championships 1898-1954
RSSSF Eerste Klasse Oost
RSSSF Eerste Klasse West

Netherlands Football League Championship seasons
1904 in Dutch sport
1905 in Dutch sport